Lars "Laban" Arnesson (born 20 February 1936 in Sandviken) is a Swedish former professional football player and manager and bandy player. He was the coach of the Sweden national football team from 1980 to 1986.

Career 
Arnesson represented Djurgården 1960–64, playing 93 matches and scoring one goal as well as winning one Swedish title, in 1964.

Arnesson had great success as a coach for Östers IF and got the job as coach for the national team, leading Sweden in 1982 and 1986 World Cup qualifying. Having never taken the team to any World Cup, he resigned in 1986.
He also played for Djurgårdens IF in the early 1960s.

Following his coaching career, Arnesson worked with the FIFA technical committee to evaluate proposals for changes to the FIFA Laws of the Game.

Arnesson also played bandy for Djurgårdens IF Bandy 1961–65.

Honours
Djurgårdens IF 
 Allsvenskan: 1964

References

External links
Profile at the Swedish football association

1936 births
Living people
Association football defenders
Swedish footballers
Allsvenskan players
Djurgårdens IF Fotboll players
Swedish football managers
Sweden national football team managers
Kalmar FF managers
Djurgårdens IF Fotboll managers
Östers IF managers
Skövde AIK managers
People from Sandviken Municipality
Sportspeople from Gävleborg County
20th-century Swedish people
Swedish bandy players
Djurgårdens IF Bandy players